Preacher's Sons is a 2008 American documentary film, by C. Roebuck Reed and Mark Nealey. It follows the lives of a Unitarian Universalist minister, his husband, and the five sons they adopted from the California foster care system. The family is seen dealing with issues related to the fathers' homosexuality and the mixed-race (African American and Latino children with Caucasian parents) composition of the family, as well as the disturbed backgrounds of the children before their adoptions. The introductory segment has been aired on the public television program, In the Life. The California Council for the Humanities supported the film.

See also
Interracial adoption
LGBT adoption
Mommy Mommy - a documentary about a lesbian adoptive couple
The Kid: What Happened After My Boyfriend and I Decided to Go Get Pregnant

References

External links

Preacher's Sons at Internet Movie Database

American documentary films
Adoption in the United States
Same-sex marriage in the United States
2008 documentary films
Unitarian Universalism
Multiracial affairs in the United States
LGBT adoption
2008 films
Documentary films about adoption
Documentary films about gay men
2008 LGBT-related films
Adoption and religion
2000s American films